Elsa Garcia (born 1956) is a Mexican American Tejano singer and producer from Houston, Texas, United States. She has had four albums certified gold, and was nominated for a Grammy Award in 1991 for her album, Simplemente.

Early life
Elsa Garcia was born in Monterrey, Mexico. The daughter of Mexican singer Hermelinda “Linda La Norteña” Escamilla, she was introduced to music at an early age. At age of two, she emigrated to Houston, Texas.

Career
Garcia started as a replacement vocalist for her husband's band after their lead singer was experiencing throat problems and could not perform. Her first album Simplemente was a commercial success earning Garcia a Grammy nomination. Her second album Ni Mas, Ni Menos was her first album to be certified gold thanks to the hit song "Ya Te Vi", which later became her signature song. On May 29, 1995 she participated in the Selena tribute at the Houston Astrodome. In 1995, the then mayor of Houston declared that October 24 would be Elsa Garcia day. In 2011, Garcia was inducted into the Tejano roots Hall of Fame. In 2012, she was awarded the "Lifetime Achievement Award" at the Tejano Music Awards. Garcia has been retired from music since 1999. She is one of a few Tejano artists to get radio airplay in Mexico during the 1990s.

Discography

 Simplemente 1990
 Ni Mas, Ni Menos 1991
 Pasion 1992
 10 Grandes Exitos 1992
 Escapate Conmigo 1993
 12 Super Exitos 1994
 Diez 1995
 Tu Solamente Tu 1995
 Live Vol. 1 1996
 Como Tu Y Yo 1996
 Elsa 1998
 Tejano All Stars 2002
 Original Masters 2003
 15 De Coleccion 2003
 Face off: Elsa Garcia & Laura Canales 2008

References

1956 births
Living people
20th-century American women singers
Tejano pop musicians
21st-century American women singers
20th-century American singers
21st-century American singers
Singers from Monterrey
Musicians from Houston
Singers from Texas
Mexican emigrants to the United States
Women in Latin music